Asloun Castle is a castle, formerly Z-plan, dating from the 16th century,  south-west of Alford, in Aberdeenshire, Scotland, of which only one tower remains.  It is just east of Castleton of Asloun, and north of the Strow burn.

Alternatively it may be known as Asloon Castle. It is designated a protected scheduled monument.

History
The castle was built by the Calder family, but later came into the possession of the Forbes family.

On the night before the battle of Alford in 1645, the Marquess of Montrose stayed at the castle.

Structure
The tower, which is three storeys high, has an entrance on the south, the principal entrance to the castle.  This was the south-east tower of the castle, and it contained a turnpike stair to the first floor.   The ground floor of the hall was stone-vaulted.

There are round gun loops in the basement of the tower, while there are quirked roll mouldings on openings on upper levels.  There appears to have been private accommodation in the upper floor of the tower, access being only from the main castle.  This was lit by a large window.

There are two recesses for armorial, both now empty, one over the entrance, and the other above a first-floor level slit window.

References

Castles in Aberdeenshire
Scheduled Ancient Monuments in Aberdeenshire
Ruins in Aberdeenshire